The women's 78 kg competition at the 2017 European Judo Championships in Warsaw was held on 22 April at the Torwar Hall.

Results

Finals

Repechages

Pool A

Pool B

Pool C

Pool D

References

External links
 
 Judo - Women's 78 kg

W78
2017
European W78